The men's tournament in ice hockey at the 2014 Winter Olympics was held in Sochi, Russia between 12–23 February 2014. For the fifth consecutive Olympics, players from the National Hockey League participated. Twelve countries qualified for the tournament; nine of them did so automatically by virtue of their ranking by the International Ice Hockey Federation, while the other three took part in a qualification tournament.

In the semi-finals, Canada won over the United States, and Sweden won over Finland. In the final, Canada defeated Sweden to win the tournament for the ninth time, and avenged their 1994 gold medal loss. Finland finished with the bronze medal, defeating the US, with captain Teemu Selänne awarded as the MVP of the tournament, scoring twice in the bronze-medal game.

With the gold medal, Canada became the first men's team to successfully defend an Olympic title since the Soviet Union in 1988, the first team to finish the tournament undefeated since 1984 and the first to do both with the full NHL participation.

Canada surrendered only three goals in six games, the fewest allowed by a gold medallist since 1928 when Canada shut out the opposition in a three-game tournament. Canada also scored only seventeen goals, the fewest by a gold medal-winning team in Olympic history, although Great Britain averaged fewer goals per game at the 1936 Winter Olympics (nineteen goals in eight games).

Venue

Qualification

Canada, Czech Republic, Finland, Norway, Russia, Slovakia, Sweden, Switzerland, and the United States qualified as the top nine teams in the IIHF World Ranking in 2012. Austria, Latvia, and Slovenia qualified by winning the qualification tournament.

Rosters

Officials
The IIHF selected 14 referees and 14 linesmen to work the 2014 Winter Olympics. They were the following:

Games were primarily officiated by NHL referees, a stipulation by the NHL if most Olympic players are NHLers, according to the IIHF (not NHL) rules.

Referees
  Lars Brüggemann
  Dave Jackson
  Antonín Jeřábek
  Mike Leggo
  Brad Meier
  Konstantin Olenin
  Tim Peel

Referees
  Daniel Piechaczek
  Kevin Pollock
  Jyri Rönn
  Vladimír Šindler
  Kelly Sutherland
  Marcus Vinnerborg
  Ian Walsh

Linesmen
  Derek Amell
  Lonnie Cameron
  Chris Carlson
  Ivan Dedioulia
  Greg Devorski
  Tommy George
  Brad Kovachik

Linesmen
  Andy McElman
  André Schrader
  Sakari Suominen
  Miroslav Valach
  Mark Wheler
  Jesse Wilmot
  Chris Woodworth

Preliminary round

Tiebreak criteria
In each group, teams will be ranked according to the following criteria:
Number of points (three points for a regulation-time win, two points for an overtime or shootout win, one point for an overtime or shootout defeat, no points for a regulation-time defeat);
In case two teams are tied on points, the result of their head-to-head match will determine the ranking;
In case three or four teams are tied on points, the following criteria will apply (if, after applying a criterion, only two teams remain tied, the result of their head-to-head match will determine their ranking):
Points obtained in head-to-head matches between the teams concerned;
Goal differential in head-to-head matches between the teams concerned;
Number of goals scored in head-to-head matches between the teams concerned;
If three teams remain tied, result of head-to-head matches between each of the teams concerned and the remaining team in the group (points, goal difference, goals scored);
Place in 2013 IIHF World Ranking.

All times are local (UTC+4).

Group A

A Russian goal scored late in the third period, which would have given the team a 3-2 lead, was disallowed after referees ruled that the net was moved when the goal was scored. The decision resulted in the score remaining 2-2. USA went on to win the game in a shootout, which resulted in Russia playing a playoff qualification game while USA received a bye to the quarterfinals. The decision was criticized by many Russian politicians, TV hosts and commentators. Following the game, protesters led by the Kremlin party's youth group held a demonstration in front of the U.S. Embassy in Moscow to protest the decision. In response to the controversy, Konstantin Komissarov, the referee supervisor of International Ice Hockey Federation, officially confirmed that the decision by the referee was correct, citing the appropriate use of video review in assessing the play.

Group B

Group C

Ranking after preliminary round

Playoff round
Following the completion of the preliminary round, all teams were ranked 1D through 12D. To determine this ranking, the following criteria were used in the order presented:
higher position in the group
higher number of points
better goal difference
higher number of goals scored for
better 2013 IIHF World Ranking.

Bracket

 † Indicates overtime victory
 ‡ Indicates shootout victory

Qualification playoffs
The four highest-ranked teams (1D–4D) received byes and were deemed the home team in the quarterfinals as they are seeded to advance, with the remaining eight teams (5D–12D) playing qualification playoff games as follows.

Quarterfinals
Teams seeded D1 to D4 are the home teams.

Following the quarterfinal games, the winning teams will be re-ranked F1 through F4, with the winner of 1D vs. E4 re-ranked as F1, the winner of 2D vs. E3 re-ranked as F2, the winner of 3D vs. E2 re-ranked as F3, and the winner of 4D vs. E1 re-ranked as F4. The losers of the quarterfinal round games will receive a final ranking of 5 through 8 based on their preliminary round ranking.

Semifinals

Bronze medal game

Gold medal game
Canada won the game 3-0 with goals from Jonathan Toews, Sidney Crosby, and Chris Kunitz, each scoring their first goal of the tournament. Canada shut Sweden out with an overpowering defense limiting them to 24 shots, and Canada's goaltender Carey Price played well when needed. The Canadian team's executive director Steve Yzerman called the performance in Sochi the finest defensive effort ever for a Canadian team.  Canada shut out its opponents in the semifinals and final and allowed only three goals in six games. It was also the first time since 1928 that a Canadian team won all its games.

The win represented Canada's second consecutive men's gold in ice hockey, and the third time in four Olympics that Canada won both men's and women's gold in hockey.

The game was a national phenomenon in Canada, with more than 15 million Canadians watching at least part of the game.  Several provinces and cities relaxed their liquor laws to allow bars to open as early as 4 am.

Final rankings
The final standings of the tournament according to the IIHF:

Statistics

Average age
Team Czech Republic was the oldest team in the tournament, averaging 30 years and 7 months. Team USA was the youngest team in the tournament, averaging 27 years and 6 months. Gold medalists team Canada averaged 28 years and 9 months. Tournament average was 28 years and 10 months.

Leading scorers
Rankings based upon points, and sorted by goals.

Hat trick scorers

Leading goaltenders
Goalkeepers with 40% or more of their team's total minutes, ranked by save percentage.

Shutout posters

  (2)
  (2)
  (2)

Awards

Source: IIHF.com

Tournament all-star team

References

External links
Official IIHF website

 
2013–14 in Russian ice hockey
Men's events at the 2014 Winter Olympics